Birgitta Elisa Oftestad (born 12 May 2002) is a Norwegian cellist and winner of the 2018 Virtuos competition.

Biography 
Oftestad was born in Oslo, started playing cello at the age of 5, and is a student at Barratt Due Institute of Music with Ole Eirik Ree as main teacher. She has been a part of their talent program since 2012. She was a soloist at Oslo Chamber Music Festival and played at the Festspillene i Bergen, where she participated with Crescendo's chamber music program in 2016 with the clarinet trio DaNiBi. She also played as a soloist at many other concerts in Norway and internationally, and has won a lot of prizes, both as chamber musician and soloist. Among these are the Midgard Competition, Young Musicians in Tallinn, Sparre-Olsen Competition and Youth Music Championship, where she was a superfinalist in 2017.

Honors 

 2017: Winner of Solistkonkurransen during the Fjord Cadenza
 2018: Winner of Virtuos

References

External links 
 Fjord Cadenza 2017 – Birgitta Elisa Oftestad

2002 births
Living people
Musicians from Oslo
Child classical musicians
Norwegian women musicians
Norwegian classical cellists
Barratt Due Institute of Music alumni
Eurovision Young Musicians Finalists
21st-century women musicians
Women classical cellists
21st-century cellists